Soluntakh (Soluntax) is a freshwater lake in the Sakha Republic (Yakutia), Russia.
It is one of the largest lakes in the Allaikhovsky District. The region where Soluntakh lies is uninhabited.

Like most bodies of water in the area in has not been studied enough. A sector of the lake is a protected area.

Geography
Soluntakh lake is located north of the Arctic circle, in the central part of the Yana-Indigirka Lowland. All other inflowing rivers are small. There are many smaller lakes in the vicinity. The lake begins to freeze in mid September and stays under ice until early June.

Fauna
The greater white-fronted goose and bean goose are some of the bird species known to nest in the lake. Soluntakh has also been explored as one of the probable sites providing a habitat for the Siberian crane, a critically endangered species.
Lake Soluntakh is rich in fish.

See also
List of lakes of Russia

References

External links
Fishing & Tourism in Yakutia
Рыбалка в Якутии

Lakes of the Sakha Republic
East Siberian Lowland
Drainage basins of the East Siberian Sea